There have been two runs of the US TV series Dallas.

List of Dallas (1978 TV series) episodes, a 1978−1991 U.S. drama series
List of Dallas (2012 TV series) episodes, a 2012–2014 revival of the 1978 series